Virtway is a game development studio located in Oviedo, Spain. It was founded in 1999 as a general IT consulting firm. In 2006 Virtway spun off from its parent company to focus on 3D development and video games as an independent branch of the Indigo Group holding.

Overview 

The main focus of the company has been developing a simulation system to allow learning through gaming, called VTS (Virtual Training System). The platform was presented at the 2008 Games + Learning + Society conference in partnership with Robb Lindgren from Stanford University. The company's products are applied to several areas of training, such as Firefighting and Iron/Steel Industry.

Virtway has collaborated through the Índigo Group with University of Oviedo and Stanford University in different research and development projects.

Products 
Molina Digital was the first large-scale 3D project developed by Virtway. It was the recreation of a Spanish town (Molina de Segura, Murcia) where users could chat, drive cars and play Pétanque, through a Web browser.

Part of the Molina Digital project was the development of an Interactive Theatre, an application where users could take a role in a virtual play. Each user handles an avatar on stage and controls its body language and facial expression while talking with other players. Everything is recorded by another user, the director, who edits the footage later, in a way similar to a machinima production.

Virtway has also been contracted by the regional government of Asturias to develop a 3D virtual visit of the city of Llanes. The result of this contract is a website where users can visit said town in 3D using x3d technology and a port of the landmarks to Google Earth KML models.

Videogames 

Virtway started the development of a project called Born To Run in 2004 and presented it in late 2006. It aimed to be one of the first First Person Shooters with photo-realistic graphics made in Spain, and slated to hit next-gen systems (PC, PlayStation 3 and Xbox 360). There has been no more information about the game since its announcement, and it is now considered to be vaporware.

On 6 October 2008, Virtway entered into a partnership with ICYou, a Swedish company, to further develop their Interactive City platform, a persistent virtual world with tie-ins to the real world of its players through a blend of virtual and real economy.

References

External links 
 Official Virtway website

Asturias
Spanish companies established in 1999
Simulation software
Video game companies of Spain
Video game development companies
Virtual reality companies